Maurice Meeuwissen (born 14 May, 1969) is a Dutch politician and member of the Party for Freedom.

Meeuwissen served as an officer in the Dutch army before studying for a degree in mechanical engineering at Delft University of Technology. Furthermore, Meeuwissen worked as an engineer in the IT and telecom industries before obtaining a Master's degree in healthcare management at Erasmus University Rotterdam. Meeuwissen became the leader and spokesman for the PVV in South Holland and was elected to the States of South Holland during the 2019 Dutch provincial elections. Since 2018 he has also been a municipal councilor in the Municipal council of Rotterdam where he forms a one man faction for the PVV.

References 

1969 births
21st-century Dutch politicians
Living people
Members of the Provincial Council of South Holland
Party for Freedom politicians